Nick Runderkamp (born 6 August 1996) is a Dutch footballer who plays as a midfielder for Quick Boys in the Tweede Divisie.

Career
Runderkamp progressed through the youth academy of FC Volendam. He made his professional debut on 5 May 2017, when appeared against Fortuna Sittard with Volendam in a 3–0 loss. Two weeks later, he made his home debut during the play-off match against NAC Breda, which ended in a 2–2 draw. He scored the 2–1 goal after 85 minutes after an assist from Rihairo Meulens.

In the 2017–18 season, Runderkamp received more playing time under the new head coach Misha Salden. On 12 January 2018, Runderkamp scored again in a match against FC Oss. After an hour of play, he scored from the halfway line, beating goalkeeper Xavier Mous. The goal was subsequently chosen by magazine Voetbal International as their "Goal of the Week". At the end of the season, the goal was voted "Goal of the Year" by supporters of FC Volendam.

In the 2018–19 season, Runderkamp mainly played in the reserve team of Volendam, Jong Volendam. With Jong Volendam he won the Derde Divisie Sunday championship that season. In the championship game against HSC '21, which Jong Volendam won 6–1, he played 75 minutes. The following season, Runderkamp mainly continued appearing as a substitute for the first team. Volendam announced on 31 March 2020, that his expiring contract would not be renewed, effectively making him a free agent.

On 31 August 2020, Runderkamp signed with Tweede Divisie club Quick Boys in order to chase more playing time.

Honours
Jong Volendam
 Derde Divisie Sunday: 2018–19

References

External links
 
 

1996 births
Living people
Dutch footballers
FC Volendam players
Eerste Divisie players
Derde Divisie players
People from Purmerend
Association football midfielders
Tweede Divisie players
Quick Boys players
Footballers from North Holland